Reiners is a surname. Notable people with the name include:

Portia Reiners (born 1990), American actress
Jamal Reiners (born 1998), Australian footballer
Joca Reiners Terron (born 1968), Brazilian poet, novelist, designer and editor
William A. Reiners (born 1937), American ecologist

See also
Reiner (disambiguation)

Surnames from given names